Ernest Greenwood may refer to:
 Ernest Greenwood (politician)
 Ernest Greenwood (artist)